This is a list of mayors of the city of Brantford, Ontario, Canada.

Until 1956 mayors were elected for one year terms. Beginning in 1957, mayoral terms were extended to two years by Ontario law. In 1987, the provincial government changed the Municipal Elections Act to require local government elections every three years.

Town of Brantford (1847-1876) 

 William Muirhead, 1847
 Dr. Alfred Digby, 1848-1849
 Philip Cady VanBrocklin, 1850
 John Henry Moore, 1851
 Arunah Huntington, 1852
 George Samuel Wilkes, 1853
 James Kerby, 1854
 William Mathews, 1855-1856
 Thomas Botham, 1857
 Matthew William Pruyn, 1858
 Thomas Botham, 1859 (second time)
 Joseph Duffett Clement, 1860-1863
 James Weymes, 1864-1865
 John Elliott, 1866-1868
 William Mathews, 1869-1871 (second time)
 William Paterson, 1872
 William Mathews, 1873-1874 (third time)
 Dr. James W. Digby, 1875-1876

City of Brantford (1877-Present)
 Dr. James W. Digby, 1877 (second time)
 Robert Henry, 1878-1879
 Reginald Henwood, 1880-1881
 William Watt, 1882-1883
 William J. Scarfe, 1884-1885
 Charles B. Heyd, 1886
 Robert Henry, 1887 (second time)
 Charles B. Heyd, 1888-1889 (second time)
 Samuel G. Read, 1890-1891
 Levi Secord, 1892-1893
 George Watt, 1894-1895
 Thomas Elliott, 1896-1897
 W. G. Raymond, 1898-1899
 Harry Cockshutt, 1900
 D. B. Wood, 1901-1902
 Matthew K. Halloran, 1903-1904
 Charles Waterous, 1905-1906
 J. W. Bowlby, 1907-1908
 W. B. Wood, 1909-1910
 Ross A. Rastall, 1911
 Charles H. Hartman, 1912-1913
 John H. Spence, 1914-1915
 J. W. Bowlby, 1916-1917
 M. M. MacBride, 1918-1920
 George Wedlake, 1921-1922 (Wedlake died March 3, 1922. C.J. Parker completed the term.)
 C.J. Parker, 1922
 Frederic W. Billo, 1923-1924
 M. M. MacBride, 1925
 J.A.D. Slemin, 1926-1927
 Ross L. Beckett, 1928-1932
 M. M. MacBride, 1933-1934
 Col MA Colquhoun, 1935
 M. M. MacBride, 1936-1937
 R. J. Waterous, 1938-1940
 John P. Ryan, 1941-1945
 John H. Matthews, 1946-1947
 W. J. Dowden, 1948-1949
 Howard E. Winter, 1950-1953
 Reg Cooper, 1954-1956
 Howard E. Winter, 1956 (second time)
 Max Sherman, 1957-1958
 Lloyd D. Hogarth, 1959-1960
 Richard Beckett, 1961-1970
 Howard E. Winter, 1971-1972 (third time)
 Charles Bowen, 1973-1980
 David Neumann, 1980-1987 (Neuman resigned in October 1987 after being elected to the Legislative Assembly of Ontario. Karen George completed the term.)
 Karen George, 1987-1991
 Bob Taylor, 1991-1994
 Chris Friel, 1994-2003
 Mike Hancock, 2003-2010
 Chris Friel, 2010-2018
 Kevin Davis, 3 December 2018-present

References

External links 
Mayors of Brantford, Brantford Public Library

 
Brantford